"Your money or your life" is a phrase used by highwaymen during robberies.

Your Money or Your Life may also refer to:
 Your Money or Your Life (1961 film), a film directed by Jerzy Skolimowski
 Your Money or Your Life (1932 film), an Italian film
 Your Money or Your Life (1966 film), a French-German comedy film starring Fernandel
 Your Money or Your Life: Transforming Your Relationship with Money and Achieving Financial Independence, a book by Joe Dominguez and Vicki Robin about simple living
 Your Money Or Your Life, a book by Neil Cavuto (compiled comments of his business show's ending comments)
 Your Money or Your Life, a UK television series presented by Alvin Hall, who also wrote a book of the same name based on the series
 Your Money or Your Life, a fictional television game show featured in the movie Time Bandits
 Your Money or Your Life, a demand made of comedian Jack Benny in one of his most famous sketches